The Arabic phrase Bila Kayf, also pronounced as Bila Kayfa, is roughly translated as "without asking how", "without knowing how or what", or "without modality" which means without considering how and without comparison. Literally, "without how" but figuratively as "in a manner that suits His majesty and transcendence". It was a way  of resolving theological problems in Islam over apparent contradictions in āyāt (verses of the Quran) by accepting without questioning. The concept is referred as Quranic literalism or Islamic literalism.

An example is  the apparent contradiction between references to God having human characteristics (such as the "hand of God" or the "face of God") and the concept of God as being transcendental. The position of attributing actual hands or an actual face to God was known in Arabic as tajsim or tashbih (corporealism or anthropomorphism).

Another was the question of how the Quran could be both the word of God, but never have been created by God because (as many hadith testified) it has always existed.

History
Al-Ashʻarī (c. 873–936) originated the use of the term in his development of the orthodox Ash'ari theology against some of the paradoxes of the rationalist Muʿtazila. Instead of explaining that God has a literal face, which would anthropomorphize God, he explained that the earliest Muslims simply accepted the verses as they stand - without asking how or what.

Another source credits Ahmad ibn Hanbal, founder of the Hanbali school of fiqh (Islamic jurisprudence) as the original creator of the doctrine.

Interpretation
The term "bi-la kayf" is the belief that the verses of the Qur'an with an "unapparent meaning" should be accepted as they have come without saying how they are meant.

See also 

 Tanzih
 Biblical literalism
 Bibliolatry
 Superstitions in Muslim societies
 Quranic inerrancy

References

External links
Literalism and the Attributes of Allah by Sheikh Nuh Keller
Imam Ahmad ibn Hanbal by Sheikh Nuh Keller
Muslimphilosophy.com
Sacred Texts.com

Islamic terminology
Arabic words and phrases
Islamic theology
Allah